Junedale is an unincorporated community located in Banks Township in Carbon County, Pennsylvania, United States. Junedale is part of the Lehigh Valley, which has a population of 861,899 and is the 68th most populated metropolitan area in the U.S. as of the 2020 census. 

Junedale is located along Main Street west of Beaver Meadows and east of Tresckow.

References

Unincorporated communities in Carbon County, Pennsylvania